Gauteng (formerly Transvaal) is the first-class cricket team of the southern parts of Gauteng province of South Africa. The team was called Transvaal from April 1890 to April 1997 (the area north of Johannesburg, including Pretoria being part of the Northerns, formerly Northern Transvaal). Under the main competition's various names – the Currie Cup, then the Castle Cup, now the SuperSport Series – Transvaal/Gauteng cricket team has been the most successful of the South African domestic sides, winning 25 times. The club's most glorious period was the 1980s when they were dubbed the "Mean Machine".

For the purposes of the SuperSport Series, Gauteng merged with North West (formerly Western Transvaal) to form the Highveld Lions or, more simply, "the Lions". (from October 2004 to 2021).

Honours
 Currie Cup (25) - 1889–90, 1894–95, 1902–03, 1903–04, 1904–05, 1906–07, 1923–24, 1925–26, 1926–27, 1929–30, 1934–35, 1950–51, 1958–59, 1968–69, 1970–71, 1971–72, 1972–73, 1978–79, 1979–80, 1982–83, 1983–84, 1984–85, 1986–87, 1987–88, 1999–00; shared (4) - 1921–22, 1937–38, 1965–66, 1969–70
 Standard Bank Cup (6) - 1981–82, 1982–83, 1984–85, 1992–93, 1997–98, 2003–04
 South African Airways Provincial Three-Day Challenge (2) - 2006–07, 2012-13; 'shared (1) –  2014-15
 South African Airways Provincial One-Day Challenge (1) - 2007–08
 Gillette/Nissan Cup (9) - 1973–74, 1978–79, 1979–80, 1980–81, 1982–83, 1983–84, 1984–85, 1985–86, 1990–91

Squad
In April 2021, Cricket South Africa confirmed the following squad ahead of the 2021–22 season.

 Bjorn Fortuin
 Wiaan Mulder
 Lutho Sipamla
 Kagiso Rapulana
 Ryan Rickelton
 Joshua Richards
 Sisanda Magala
 Dominic Hendricks
 Tladi Bokako
 Malusi Siboto
 Duanne Olivier
 Ruan Haasbroek
 Tshepo Ntuli
 Mitchell van Buuren
 Codi Yusuf
 Levert Manje
 Kagiso Rabada
 Rassie van der Dussen
 Temba Bavuma
 Reeza Hendricks

Former players
Among the notable players are: Clive Rice, Jimmy Cook, Sylvester Clarke, Graeme Pollock, Alvin Kallicharran, Roy Pienaar, Hugh Page, Richard Snell, Henry Fotheringham, Ray Jennings and Rohan Kanhai.

Venues
Venues have included:
 Old Wanderers, Johannesburg (1891–1946)
 Berea Park, Pretoria (occasional venue Dec 1906 - Jan 1932; Northerns venue from 1937)
 Willowmoore Park, Benoni (occasional venue Dec 1923 - Dec 1931; Northerns venue from 1948)
 Ellis Park, Johannesburg (1946–1956)
 New Wanderers Stadium, Johannesburg (1956–present)
 Vereeniging Brick and Tile Recreation Ground (one game in 1966)
 New Wanderers No 1 Oval, Johannesburg (occasional venue Nov 1968 - Dec 1991)
 Strathvaal Cricket Club A Ground, Stilfontein (occasional venue Dec 1963 - March 1976)
 South African Defence Force Ground, Potchefstroom (one game in Dec 1972)
 Lenasia Stadium, Johannesburg (occasional venue Jan 1977 - Nov 2002)
 George Lea Sports Club, Johannesburg (two games in 1983)
 Dick Fourie Stadium, Vereeniging (two matches 1989 - 1991)
 NF Oppenheimer Ground, Randjesfontein (three matches 1995 - 2004)

References

Sources
 South African Cricket Annual – various editions
 Wisden Cricketers' Almanack – various editions
 "Cricinfo"

South African first-class cricket teams
Highveld Lions
Cricket teams in Gauteng